Øvre Rendal is a former municipality in the old Hedmark county, Norway. The  municipality existed from 1880 until its dissolution in 1965 when it was merged with the neighboring municipality of Ytre Rendal to form the new Rendalen Municipality. The administrative centre was the village of Bergset where Øvre Rendal Church is located.

History
On 1 January 1838, the large municipality of Rendal was established. This municipality spanned  from the Østerdalen valley to the border with Sweden. During the 1870s, discussions began on dividing the large municipality. On 1 January 1880, the municipality of Rendal was split in two to create the municipalities of Øvre Rendal (population: 1,868) and Ytre Rendal (population: 1,661). On 1 January 1911, the new municipality of Engerdal was established to the east of Øvre Rendal. This new municipality was created by taking  of eastern Øvre Rendal, plus area from the neighboring municipalities of Ytre Rendal, Tolga, and Trysil. This portion of Øvre Rendal that became part of Engerdal had 381 residents. During the 1960s, there were many municipal mergers across Norway due to the work of the Schei Committee. On 1 January 1965, the new municipality of Rendalen was created by merging Øvre Rendal (population: 1,629) and Ytre Rendal (population: 1,913).

Government
All municipalities in Norway, including Øvre Rendal, are responsible for primary education (through 10th grade), outpatient health services, senior citizen services, unemployment and other social services, zoning, economic development, and municipal roads. The municipality was governed by a municipal council of elected representatives, which in turn elected a mayor.

Municipal council
The municipal council  of Øvre Rendal was made up of 17 representatives that were elected to four year terms.  The party breakdown of the final municipal council was as follows:

See also
List of former municipalities of Norway

References

Rendalen
Former municipalities of Norway
1880 establishments in Norway
1965 disestablishments in Norway